Kindred Spirits is the fifth studio album by English jazz composer Zoe Rahman, released on 23 January 2012 by Manushi Records.

Background an composition
Kindred Spirits is inspired by Zoe Rahman's discovery of the connections between Irish and Scottish folk music and the work of Bengali poet, composer and artist Rabindranath Tagore. The album includes three tracks written by Rabindranath Tagore and Stevie Wonder's "Contusion". Rahman wrote over half of the tracks 

The album was recorded in spring 2011.

Critical response

John Fordham of The Guardian rated Kindred Spirits 4/5 and called the album "..a varied and widely appealing set..." Martin Longley of BBC Music called the album "A set melding its varied constituents into a deeply personal final form." ABC Online said of the album, it  "stretches from ballads to McCoy Tyner-like muscularity and even a version of Contusion."

Chris May of All About Jazz said of the album, "It all adds up to another bliss infusion." Barry Witherden of Jazz Journal rated the album 4/5 and described it as a "McCoy Tyner style modalism, subcontinental raga and touches of Irish folk inspired by her [Rahman's] mother's Hibernian origins. Chris Parker of The Jazz Mann called the album "A rich confection..."

Track listing

Personnel
Musicians

Zoe Rahman – piano, harmonium
Gene Calderazzo – drums
Oli Hayhurst – bass
Idris Rahman – clarinet
Courtney Pine – flute, alto saxophone

Technical
Vinod Gadher – executive producer
Curtis Schwartz – mix engineer, recording engineer
Mandy Parnell – mastering engineer

Awards and nominations

References

External links

2012 albums
Instrumental albums
Zoe Rahman albums